James Foreman may refer to:
 James Foreman (Canadian businessman), important force in the business community of Nova Scotia
 James David Morton Foreman, New Zealand engineer and businessman
 James L. Foreman, American judge

See also
 James Forman (disambiguation)